Licinia Lentini  (born 4 March 1959) is an Italian actress and television personality. She was sometimes credited as  Lilian Lacy and Licia Lee Lyon.

Life and career
Born in Rome, Lentini achieved a wide popularity in 1980 as a showgirl in the RAI variety show Studio '80. Her film career includes roles of weight in several genre films and comedy films. She also appeared in several TV serials. From the mid-1980s she focused her career on theater and dubbing.

Selected filmography
 Sturmtruppen (1976) 
 Silver Saddle (1978) 
 Being Twenty (1978) 
 War of the Robots (1978) 
 Gardenia (1979) 
 Day of the Cobra (1980) 
 I carabbimatti (1981)
 Prickly Pears (1981) 
  (1981) 
 Vacanze di Natale (1983) 
 Crime in Formula One (1984) 
 L'allenatore nel pallone (1984) 
 Il commissario Lo Gatto (1987) 
 Django 2 (1987) 
 My Name Is Tanino (2002)
 Vanilla and Chocolate (2004)

References

External links 

1959 births
Living people
Actresses from Rome
Italian film actresses
Italian television personalities
Italian television actresses
Italian stage actresses
Italian voice actresses